Roger Pearman (born ) is an English rugby union and rugby league footballer who played in the 1960s, and coached rugby league in the 1960s.

Background
Roger Pearman's birth was  registered in Wakefield district, West Riding of Yorkshire, England.

Playing career

Challenge Cup Final appearances
Roger Pearman played  in Wakefield Trinity ’s 25-10 victory over Wigan in the 1963 Challenge Cup Final during the 1962–63 season at Wembley Stadium, London on Saturday 11 May 1963, in front of a crowd of 84,492.

Australian career
Roger was selected in first-grade upon his arrival and became the 300th player to play first-grade for the club. He went on to become a regular member of the team in his initial season.

Coaching career
After an injury interrupted his 1965 season, Roger was appointed first-grade coach in 1966. He commenced the 1966 season in first-grade but forfeited his position to allow George Taylforth back into the team.

He played in third grade so that he could adequately prepare for the coaching role in first-grade. In 1967, Kevin Ryan was appointed captain-coach of first-grade.

References

External links
Statistics at rugbyleagueproject.org
Roger Pearman biography & coaching statistics at Canterbury Bulldogs
Roger Pearman biography & player statistics at Canterbury Bulldogs
Rugby League Final 1963
Roger Pearman Photo at Canterbury Bulldogs

1939 births
Living people
Canterbury-Bankstown Bulldogs coaches
Canterbury-Bankstown Bulldogs players
English rugby league coaches
English rugby league players
English rugby union players
Leeds Tykes players
People educated at Queen Elizabeth Grammar School, Wakefield
Rugby articles needing expert attention
Rugby league locks
Rugby league players from Wakefield
Rugby union players from Wakefield
Wakefield Trinity players